The  is a subway line of the Tokyo Metropolitan Bureau of Transportation (Toei) network in Tokyo, Japan. The line runs between Nishi-Takashimadaira in Itabashi and Meguro in Shinagawa.

The line was named after the Mita district in Minato, Tokyo, under which it passes. On maps and signboards, the line is shown in blue. Stations carry the letter "I" followed by a two-digit number.

Overview
Platforms on the Mita Line are equipped with chest-height automatic platform gates that open in sync with the train doors. The line was the first in the Tokyo subway system to have low barriers. The Tokyo Metro Namboku Line has used full-height platform screen doors since its opening. As of May 2020, the platform doors are being overhauled for future 8 car operations.

The right-of-way and stations between Shirokane-Takanawa and Meguro are shared with the Tokyo Metro Namboku Line - a unique situation on the Tokyo subway where both operators share common infrastructure. Under an agreement of both parties, the fare for this section is calculated on the Toei system for passengers travelling to stations on the Mita Line past Shirokane-Takanawa, using the Tokyo Metro system for those travelling on the Namboku Line past Shirokane-Takanawa, and on the system "most beneficial to the passenger" (presently the Tokyo Metro schedule) for travel solely on the shared section.

According to the Tokyo Metropolitan Bureau of Transportation, as of June 2009, the Mita Line is the ninth most crowded subway line in Tokyo, running at 164% capacity between Nishi-Sugamo and Sugamo stations.

Station list 
All stations are located in Tokyo.

Rolling stock

Present
 Toei 6300 series 6-car sets(since 1993)
 Toei 6500 series 8-car sets (since 14 May 2022)
 Tokyu 3000 series 6/8-car sets(since 1999)
Tokyu 3020 series 8-car sets(since 2020)
 Tokyu 5080 series 8-car sets (since 2003)
 Sotetsu 21000 series 8-car sets (since 18 March 2023)

Former rolling stock

 Toei 6000 series (from 1968 until 1999)
 Toei 10-000 series (prototype for Shinjuku Line EMUs)

Maintenance facilities
Shimura Depot at Takashimadaira

History

The Mita Line was first envisioned in 1957 as a northern branch of Line 5 (the present Tōzai Line), serving the section between Ōtemachi and Itabashi. Under a revised proposal in 1962, the line was made independent and its construction was undertaken by the Tokyo Metropolitan Government.

Due to political considerations, the design of the Mita Line changed several times during the early 1960s. There were plans for it to run to Toda, Saitama, to serve a boat-racing venue for the 1964 Summer Olympics. The government of Saitama also proposed the construction of a new subway line which would allow through service on the Mita Line as far as Ōmiya Station. As a result, the construction standards of Line 6 were based on those of Tobu and Tokyu (such as  gauge track and 20-meter-long cars - today, the Mita Line is the only Toei line to use this gauge). A depot was planned at Shimura, independent of the Nishi-Magome depot on Line 1.

However, both Tokyu and Tobu decided the following year to operate their thorough services with the Teito Rapid Transit Authority (TRTA, now Tokyo Metro) lines instead. With no thorough service opportunities available the Tokyo Metropolitan Government began construction on the central portion of the line, leaving the plans for the Itabashi and Mita ends open for future development.

The northern  extension (originally licensed to Tobu and later transferred to Toei Subway) was completed on 6 May 1976. For the next 24 years, the line operated between Mita and Nishi-Takashimadaira; the authorized Mita and Sengakuji section had been left uncompleted.

In 1985 the then-Ministry of Transport finally settled the plan regarding the southern extension of the line and shelved all plans for further extension to the north due to the development of the Saikyō Line. On 26 September 2000, the final 4 km segment from Mita to Meguro opened, and through service to the Meguro Line of Tokyu began at the same time, at which point the line switched to driver-only operation.

By the end of 2020, all platform screen doors on the Mita Line were extended to accommodate 8 cars in preparation of the Sōtetsu Tōkyū Link Line through service from the Sotetsu Line. 

Mita Line through services to and from the Sotetsu Line began operation on 18 March 2023. Effective this date, the Mita Line provides through services as far south as Ebina on the Sotetsu Main Line and Shonandai on the Sotetsu Izumino Line, with a fraction of trips turning around at Shin-Yokohama Station. Most local services still make it as far south as Hiyoshi on the Tokyu Toyoko Line with some peak hour trips terminating at Musashi-Kosugi (also on the Toyoko Line).

Notes 

a. Crowding levels defined by the Ministry of Land, Infrastructure, Transport and Tourism:

100% — Commuters have enough personal space and can take a seat or stand while holding onto the straps or hand rails.
150% — Commuters have enough personal space to read a newspaper.
180% — Commuters must fold newspapers to read.
200% — Commuters are pressed against each other in each compartment but can still read small magazines.
250% — Commuters are pressed against each other, unable to move.

References

External links

 Toei Transportation Information 

 
Mita
Railway lines in Tokyo
Railway lines opened in 1968
1067 mm gauge railways in Japan
1968 establishments in Japan